David Williams (born 7 August 1966) is a British sailor. He competed at the 1992 Summer Olympics and the 1996 Summer Olympics.

References

External links
 

1966 births
Living people
British male sailors (sport)
Olympic sailors of Great Britain
Sailors at the 1992 Summer Olympics – Tornado
Sailors at the 1996 Summer Olympics – Tornado
Sportspeople from Canterbury